Jerri is a feminine given name. Notable people with the name include:

 Jerri Allyn (born 1954), American artist
 Jerri Bergström (born 1963), Swedish fencer
 Jerri Manthey (born 1970), American actress
 Jerri Mumford (1909–2002), Canadian military servicewoman during World War II
 Jerri Nielsen (1952–2009), American physician
 Jerri Winters (21st century), American singer

Feminine given names
English feminine given names
Swedish feminine given names